Petrophile crispata is a species of flowering plant in the family Proteaceae and is endemic to southwestern Western Australia. It is a shrub with pinnately-divided leaves with sharply-pointed tips, and oval heads of glabrous, yellow flowers.

Description

Taxonomy
Petrophile crispata was first formally described in 1830 by Robert Brown in the Supplementum to his Prodromus Florae Novae Hollandiae et Insulae Van Diemen from material collected by William Baxter near King Georges Sound in 1829. The specific epithet (crispata) means "curled" or "crinkled", referring to the hairs on the branchlets.

Distribution and habitat
This petrophile grows in shrubland and woodland between Cranbrook, Cheyne Bay near Cape Riche and Woodanilling in the Avon Wheatbelt, Esperance Plains, Jarrah Forest and Mallee biogeographical regions of southwestern Western Australia.

Conservation status
Petrophile crispata is classified as "not threatened" by the Western Australian Government Department of Parks and Wildlife.

References

crispata
Eudicots of Western Australia
Endemic flora of Western Australia
Plants described in 1830